Engine City  is a science fiction novel by Scottish writer Ken MacLeod, published in 2002.
It is the third novel in the Engines of Light Trilogy.

The novel follows on from Dark Light and is also set in the "Second Sphere", primarily in the city of Nova Babylonia, the plot centering on the arrival of humans from the edge of the sphere offering immortality and warning of an impending alien invasion.

Literary significance and reception
The Publishers Weekly review for the novel said:

References

External links

 Engine City at Worlds Without End

2002 British novels
2002 science fiction novels
Novels by Ken MacLeod
Orbit Books books